Enoclerus nigripes is a species of checkered beetle in the family Cleridae. It is found in Central America and North America.

Subspecies
These two subspecies belong to the species Enoclerus nigripes:
 Enoclerus nigripes nigripes (Say, 1823)
 Enoclerus nigripes rufiventris (Spinola, 1844) (redbellied clerid)

References

Further reading

External links

 

Clerinae
Articles created by Qbugbot
Beetles described in 1823